Anuja Trehan Kapur (born 24 October 1975) is an Indian criminal psychologist who is also known as a counselor, social activist and advocate.
Editor- Atul Tiwari

Early life and education
Born in Delhi India, in a Punjabi family. She went to Queen Mary School in Tis Hazari, Delhi and later earned a bachelor's degree in psychology and master's degree in criminology from Delhi University.

Kapur later completed another course in forensic science from Department of Anthropology, University of Delhi. She holds an International diploma in victimology from The Tokiawa International Victimology Institute, Japan. She also completed her LLB from CCS University.

Professional career
After graduating from Delhi University, Kapur joined Delhi Public School as a student counselor. Later, she joined CURES NGO as executive director.

Kapur started sharing theories on various high-profile criminal cases such as Indrani Mukerjea case, the Somnath Bharti case, the Asaram Bapu case, the Sunanda Pushkar, the 2008 Noida double murder case (known as the "Aarushi murder" case), the 2012 Delhi gang rape (known as the "Nirbhaya rape case", and the 2014 Badaun gang rape allegations.

As a psychologist she shares input on various psychological and mental issues related to abnormal behavior, suicide, child psychology, divorce, bullying, remarriage and its effects on children, social media and networking, and relationship issues.

Kapur founded a non-governmental organization named Nirbhiya Ek Shakti, which is the Center for Victim Assistance. She spent one day in Sheroes Cafe for the purpose of giving counseling to the victims in Agra. Under the Operation Nirbheek she did counseling for various government students in municipal and private schools on. She also raises her voice for acid attack victims.

Kapur attended the 15th International Symposium, which was organized by WSV, Victim Support Australia, Angelhands and the Australian Institute of Criminology.

In March 2017, Kapur defended the case of a 24-year-old Delhi based model girl and a 16-year-old Nepalese girl who were allegedly raped and then forced into prostitution.

In April 2017, Kapur spoke with India Today Education on different levels of depression and how to tackle them.

Awards and recognition
 Indian Icon Awards by Time India News, 2015
 India Excellence Awards by Time India News, 2016
 2016 - KAF Business and Entertainment Global Award in the Best Criminal Psychologist category
 2016 - Best Criminal Psychologist Award at the Women Excellence Achiever's Award (WEAA) held in Jaipur by Harish Soni
Appointed as the Special Police Officer for Delhi Police, North West Delhi, 2016

Personal life
Kapur resides in Delhi and she is married to Amit Kapur, a businessman from Delhi. They have two sons.

References

External links
Anuja Trehan Kapoor's interview on QNA India

1975 births
Living people
Scientists from Delhi
Indian psychologists
Indian women psychologists
Indian women activists
Indian women social scientists
Women scientists from Delhi
21st-century Indian social scientists